Adotela concolor is a species of Broscinae in the genus Adotela. A. concolor is an endemic species found in Western Australia, Australia.

Distribution

Adotela concolor is found in the south western coastal areas of Western Australia and has been collected from the Swan River basin.

References

Broscini
Beetles of Australia